Nectandra crassiloba is a species of plant in the family Lauraceae. It is endemic to Ecuador.  Its natural habitats are subtropical or tropical moist lowland forests and subtropical or tropical moist montane forests.

References

crassiloba
Endemic flora of Ecuador
Least concern plants
Least concern biota of South America
Taxonomy articles created by Polbot